Platynota exasperatana, the exasperating platynota moth, is a species of moth of the family Tortricidae. It is found in North America from Quebec to Florida, west to Texas and north to Michigan and Ontario.

The wingspan is about 13 mm. The forewings are pale grey, shaded with darker grey to blackish in the median and basal areas and marked with traces of black lines. The hindwings vary from light to dark brownish grey. Adults have been recorded on wing from July to August.

References

Moths described in 1875
Platynota (moth)